Michael Phelps Ward, CBE (26 March 1925 – 7 October 2005) was an English surgeon and an expedition doctor on the 1953 first ascent of Mount Everest with Sir Edmund Hillary.  He argued that the conquest of the mountain was a victory for science since doctors had finally figured out how to cope with the physiological effects of high altitude.  His discoveries a few years earlier in the Royal Geographical Society archives of the Milne-Hink map and unofficial RAF photos of the Everest area helped to make the summit ascent possible.

He had been on the earlier 1951 British Mount Everest reconnaissance expedition which pioneered the route used by the 1953 expedition. He was asked by Eric Shipton to go on the 1952 British Cho Oyu expedition, but was completing his national military service and sitting a surgery examination. 

He was a pioneer in high altitude medicine, which he researched with Griffith Pugh on the 1960-61 Silver Hut expedition.

He wrote numerous books including Everest: A Thousand Years of Exploration.

He was a supporter of the National Health Service and the East End of London rather than Harley Street. He was a lecturer in Clinical Surgery at the London Hospital Medical College 1975–93, and Consultant Surgeon at St Andrew's Hospital, Bow 1964-93 and Newham Hospital 1983–93.

He was appointed a CBE in 1983. He was from London. He wrote an autobiography In This Short Span (1972).

References
Obituary in "The Times" (London) of 17 October 2005; Issue 68520 page 56.

Further reading 

Mount Everest
1925 births
2005 deaths
English mountain climbers
People educated at Marlborough College
Alumni of Peterhouse, Cambridge
English surgeons
Medical doctors from London
20th-century British medical doctors
20th-century surgeons